In Polish heraldry, the przepaska is an element of the eagle charge, in the form of a curved bar, or a crescent, on the wings, and sometimes breast, of an eagle.Alfred Znamierowski: Heraldyka i weksylologia, Warsaw, 2017. Most notably, it is present in the coat of arms of Poland, and Lower Silesia, and their derivatives. This is the equivalent of the Brustspange and Kleestengel in German heraldry. (The charge does not occur in English heraldry and has no specific name).

Characteristics and usage 
There are two commonly-used versions of this charge. One of them is an upwards-curved bar, usually ended in a trefoil, placed on both wings of an eagle. It usually is of either yellow (golden), or white (silver) colour. Such a version, coloured white, is used in the current coat of arms of Poland. Historically, the yellow (golden) colour had also been used. Additionally, it is present in various coat of arms derived from this one, including the arms of various voivodeships of Poland: Greater Poland, Lesser Poland, Lubusz, Świętokrzyskie, and Warmian-Masurian. Historically, yellow (golden) Kleestengel were also used in some versions of the coat of arms of Prussia.

The other form is a white (silver) crescent, with a cross pattée on the top in the centre, that is positioned across the wings and breast of an eagle. It originates from the coat of arms of Silesia, that had been introduced in 1224 by Henry II the Pious, duke of Silesia. Currently, as part of a charge derived from Henry's coat of arms, it is present in the arms of the Czech Republic and Liechtenstein, as well as of the Lower Silesian Voivodeship of Poland, and the Central Bohemian, Moravian-Silesian, and Olomouc regions of the Czech Republic.

References 

Heraldry
Heraldic charges
Heraldic eagles
Polish heraldry